Dera Ghazi Khan (Urdu, Saraiki:) is a district in the Punjab province of Pakistan. Its capital is the Dera Ghazi Khan city. 

The district lies to the west of the Indus River.

Administration 
The district is divided into three tehsils  which are divided into a total of sixty Union Councils:

Dera Ghazi Khan Tehsil 

Dera Ghazi Khan Tehsil, an administrative subdivision of the district. The city of Dera Ghazi Khan is itself administratively subdivided into seven Union Councils.

History 
The city was founded at the close of the 15th century and named after Nawab Ghazi Khan Mirani, son of Nawab Haji Khan Mirani, a Baloch chieftain, who had declared independence from the Langah Sultanate's Sultans of Multan. Together with two other Deras i.e. settlements, Dera Ismail Khan and Dera Fateh Khan, it gave its name to Derajat. Derajat eventually came into the possession of the British after the Sikh War in 1849 and was divided into two districts: Dera Ghazi Khan and Dera Ismail Khan. After the independence, many of the city's Hindu residents settled in Derawal Nagar colony of Delhi, India. The district of Rajanpur was later carved out of the Dera Ghazi Khan district.

Based on the surveys of 2004–2005, Dera Ghazi Khan district is considered one of the twenty poorest districts of Pakistan with about 51% of its population living under the poverty line.

Demographics 
At the time of the 2017 census the district had a population of 2,872,631, of which 1,451,327 were males and 1,421,127 females. Rural population is 2,326,410 while the urban population is 546,221. The literacy rate was 46.67%.

Religion 
As per the 2017 census, the vast majority of the population was Muslim and made up nearly the entire population with 99.89%.

Languages 
At the time of the 2017 Census of Pakistan, the distribution of the population of Dera Ghazi Khan District by first language was as follows:
 81.0% Saraiki
 14.7% Balochi
 2.6% Urdu
 0.8% Pashto
 0.7% Punjabi
 0.1% Sindhi
 0.0% Brahui
 0.0% Hindko
 0.0% Kashmiri
 0.1% Others

Notable people 
 Farooq Leghari, former President of Pakistan
 Usman Buzdar, former chief Minister of Punjab

Villages
 

Khalid Abad

See also

 Dera Ghazi Khan
 Dera Ghazi Khan Division
 Ghazi University
 Dera Ghazi Khan railway station
 Sulaiman Mountains
 Districts of Pakistan
 Punjab, Pakistan
 Kotri–Attock Line
 Basti Azeem
 Payala Lake Ghazi Ghat

References

External links 

 
Districts of Punjab, Pakistan
Derajat